Tambon Khao Yai may refer to:
 Tambon Khao Yai, a former subdistrict of Pak Phli District, Thailand
 Tambon Khao Yai in Ao Luek District, Krabi Province
 Tambon Khao Yai in Cha-am District, Phetchaburi Province